Sonya Gray (born 8 November 1959) is an Australian former swimmer. She competed in the women's 200 metre freestyle at the 1976 Summer Olympics.

References

External links
 

1959 births
Living people
Olympic swimmers of Australia
Swimmers at the 1976 Summer Olympics
Sportspeople from Newcastle, New South Wales
Commonwealth Games medallists in swimming
Commonwealth Games gold medallists for Australia
Commonwealth Games silver medallists for Australia
Swimmers at the 1974 British Commonwealth Games
Australian female freestyle swimmers
20th-century Australian women
Medallists at the 1974 British Commonwealth Games